East Cottage Dome, also, Erratic Dome, is a granite dome in the Tuolumne Meadows area of Yosemite National Park.

East Cottage Dome is near Daff Dome, Drug Dome, and Medlicott Dome.

On East Cottage Dome's particulars

See also West Cottage Dome, which is quite close.

East Cottage Dome has a few rock climbing routes.

References

External links and references

 One rock climbing reference
 More rock climbing
 Rock climbing The Peanut Gallery

Granite domes of Yosemite National Park